This is a list of islands called Oronsay, which provides an index for islands in Scotland with this and similar names. It is one of the more common names for Scottish islands. The names come from Örfirisey which translates from Old Norse as "tidal" or "ebb island". The many islands include:

Inner Hebrides
Eilean Ornsay, off Coll
Oronsay, Colonsay
Ornsay, by Isleornsay (Eilean Iarmain), Sound of Sleat
Oronsay, Loch Bracadale, Skye
Oronsay, Loch Sunart (enclosing Loch Drumbuie), Morvern

Outer Hebrides

Lewis
 Orasaigh off Leurbost
 Eilean Orasaigh near Cromor

North Uist
 Orasaigh N of Vallay 
 Oronsay, Outer Hebrides by the hamlet of Greinetobht (approx 85 ha; 25 m)
 Orasaigh head of Loch Euphort
 Orasaigh Loch Amhlasaraigh (west of Tobha Beag)
 Orasaigh Sound of Harris, by the hamlet of Bagh a Chaise

Benbecula
 Orasaigh Uisgeabhagh
 Orasaigh Loch Uisgebhagh
 Orasaigh N of Meanais

South Uist
 Orasaigh South-west (30m)
 Orasaigh North-east

Barra
 Orosay North (38 m)
 Orasaigh Castlebay (west)
 Orasaigh Castlebay (east)
 Orasaigh East

See also
 Isleornsay
 Orsay (disambiguation)
 Orfasay
 List of ships named Oronsay

References
 Haswell-Smith, Hamish (2004) The Scottish Islands. Edinburgh. Canongate. 
 Ordnance Survey maps
 Watson, W.J. (2004) The History of the Celtic Place-names of Scotland. Reprinted with an introduction by Simon Taylor. Edinburgh. Birlinn.

Notes

Scottish Island set index articles